St Paul's Church is in Burnley Road, Constable Lee, Rawtenstall, Lancashire, England.  It is an active Anglican parish church in the deanery of Rossendale, the archdeaconry of Bolton, and the diocese of Manchester.  The church is recorded in the National Heritage List for England as a designated Grade II listed building.

History

The church was built between 1901 and 1903 to a design by the Lancaster architects Austin and Paley, providing seating for 332 people.  The initial estimated cost was £5,000, but it finally cost £7,000 (equivalent to £ in ).

Architecture and fittings

St Paul's is a low building standing at the top of a hill.  It is constructed in sandstone with slate roofs.  The plan consists of a six-bay nave, a south aisle, two south porches, a chancel, and a northeast vestry.  The planned central tower was never built.  The porch in the first bay of the aisle has a niche containing a statue above the doorway.  The windows along the sides of the church have two, three or four lights containing Geometric tracery; some are arched, others have flat heads.  The west window has four lights, and the east window has five; both contain Perpendicular tracery.

The seven-bay arcade is carried on octagonal piers.  The pulpit is carved with images of the Four Evangelists.  The font consists of an octagonal tub with no stem, and it has a tall carved cover.

See also

Listed buildings in Rawtenstall
List of ecclesiastical works by Austin and Paley (1895–1914)

References

Church of England church buildings in Lancashire
Grade II listed churches in Lancashire
Gothic Revival church buildings in England
Gothic Revival architecture in Lancashire
Churches completed in 1903
Anglican Diocese of Manchester
Austin and Paley buildings
Buildings and structures in the Borough of Rossendale